Quweira Solar Power Plant is a 103 MW photovoltaic power station in Quweira, Jordan. When built in 2018, it was the largest solar power plant in the region. It was inaugurated on 26 April 2018, as part of Jordan's long-term plan to diversify its energy resources.

See also
Baynouna Solar Power Plant
Shams Ma'an Solar Power Plant
Tafila Wind Farm

References 

Energy infrastructure completed in 2018
Solar power in Asia
Power stations in Jordan